Aminu Baba Ali (born September 21, 1975) is a Nigerian comedian. He acts in many Hausa movies and he is also known as Baba Ari.

Early life and education
Baba Ari was born in Kofar Nassarawa of Kano admitted at Federal College of Education, Katsina, to Study Fine Art

Awards and nominations
Ari was nominated in MTN Kannywood award 2014 best comedian.

Selected film
 Faida
 Yar Mai Ganye
 Akwatin Kudi
 Bakin Lago
 Dan China
 Ibro Dan Chacha
 Aljanna Dijama
 Hassan da Hussain
 Raina
 Jakar Magori
 Layar Bata
 Maguzawa
 Mai dokar Bacci
 Mazan Bachi
 Kawa Zuci
 Rai Na
 Ragon Shiri
 Sakarkaru
 Siyasar Daushe
 Tsohon Dan Siyasa

References

Nigerian male film actors
Living people
People from Kano
Male actors in Hausa cinema
21st-century Nigerian male actors
Kannywood actors
Nigerian comedians
1975 births
Hausa people